Fools of Fortune is a 1990 Irish romantic drama film directed by Pat O'Connor and written by Michael Hirst based on the 1983 novel by Irish writer William Trevor. It depicts a Protestant family caught up in the conflict between the British Army and the IRA during the Irish War of Independence.

Cast
 Iain Glen as Willie Quinton
 Sean T. McClory as young Willie
 Mary Elizabeth Mastrantonio as Marianne
 Julie Christie as Mrs. Quinton
 Catherine McFadden as Imelda
 Amy-Joyce Hastings (credited as Amy Hastings) as Geraldine Quinton
 Michael Kitchen as Mr. Quinton
 Hazel Flanagan as Deirdre Quinton
 Frankie McCafferty as Tim Paddy
 Niamh Cusack as Josephine
 John Kavanagh as Johnny Lacy

Production
It was filmed on location in Dublin, County Westmeath, Galway and at Ardmore Studios.

Release
The film went to VHS and Laserdisc, but has not yet appeared on DVD.

New York Times reviewer Vincent Canby described the film as "an ambitious mess, of interest only because of the chance to see [Julie] Christie, who becomes more and more tautly beautiful with the years, and [Mary Elizabeth] Mastrantonio, who is also beautiful and does an extremely credible upper-class English accent." The Washington Post described it as "a passionate, mystifyingly awkward bit of filmmaking".

References

External links
 
 

1990 films
1990s historical romance films
1990 romantic drama films
British romantic drama films
Films based on works by William Trevor
Films directed by Pat O'Connor
Films scored by Hans Zimmer
Films set in Ireland
Films shot in Ireland
PolyGram Filmed Entertainment films
Working Title Films films
British historical romance films
1990s English-language films
1990s British films